The Charles River is a  channel connecting Charles Pond with the Old Course Saco River in the town of Fryeburg in western Maine, United States. It forms the natural extension of the Cold River, which flows from the White Mountains, New Hampshire, around Evans Notch south to Charles Pond.

See also
List of rivers of Maine

References

Maine Streamflow Data from the USGS
Maine Watershed Data From Environmental Protection Agency

Rivers of Maine
Saco River
Rivers of Oxford County, Maine